Banaswadi is a locality situated to the north east of Bangalore, about 6 km from the city centre. It is Ward no 27 of the BBMP and is further divided into two regions; Chikka Banaswadi and Dodda Banaswadi. Historically the area was known as primarily residential; little more than a village on the city outskirts; however the ongoing expansion of the city limits, the proximity of the locality to the international airport and the arrival of the outer ring road connecting Banaswadi to the City's IT hubs has seen the rapid improvement of the area and the emergence of a number of commercial and business activities...

Localities in the ward 27

Localities in the ward:	HRBR Layout 1st and 2nd (P) blocks, PNS Layout, Subbayya palya extension, Chowdeshwari Layout, Jai Jawan Nagar, Yerra Reddy Layout, Ex-Servicemen colony, Ramaiah Layout, Banaswadi, Dodda Banaswadi, Erappa Reddy Layout, Annaiah Reddy Layout, Vijaya Bank colony, OMBR Layout.

Demographics

The population of Banaswadi has grown by approximately 44% since 2001, adding 14,144 people. Based on 2001 Census data, 10.6% of the population are Scheduled Castes, whilst less than 1% are Scheduled Tribes.

Location
Banaswadi is located at just 2 km distance from Kasturi Nagar.

The Banaswadi Anjaneya temple in the locality is popular and it is believed that on the day of Hanuman Jayanti, the eye of the deity in stone secretes tears.

References

External links

Neighbourhoods in Bangalore